Touch 'n Go eWallet is a Malaysian digital wallet and online payment platform, established in Kuala Lumpur, Malaysia, in July 2017 as a joint venture between Touch 'n Go and Ant Financial. It allows users to make payments at over 280,000 merchant touch points via QR code; pay for tolls, street parking, payment on e-hailing, car-sharing apps or taxis via RFID or PayDirect; pay bills; top-up mobile prepaid; pay for purchases on e-commerce websites or apps; order food delivery; perform peer-to-peer money transfers; renew car insurance and purchase unique insurance plans; and purchase movie, bus, trains, and airline tickets.

Background
Before their e-wallet service was established, Touch 'n Go provided contactless card payments that allowed users in Malaysia to pay for toll roads, public transportation, and parking lots, and also allowed them to make purchases in retail stores.

Touch 'n Go has previously ventured into mobile payment through a partnership with Maxis via FastTap in 2009. It allowed Maxis customers to make payments with their Touch 'n Go technology integrated into their feature phones. The payment system utilized near-field communication (NFC), which allowed users to make payments by tapping the mobile phone to card readers, which also support physical credit, debit, and Touch 'n Go cards. Only one feature phone device was supported: the Nokia 6212 Classic. According to SoyaCincau, the service was not widely adopted by customers, and the poor reception meant that the service was generally regarded as unsuccessful.

In July 2012, Touch 'n Go announced a collaboration with CIMB and Maxis to create an NFC-based online transaction service, which can be used on NFC-enabled smartphones and allow users to make payments via NFC.
Before the partnership with Ant Financial, Touch 'n Go had originally released its e-wallet application in February 2017, which was called Touch 'n Go Wallet. It utilized QR code technology to make payments instead of relying on the NFC technology widely used by other significant e-wallet brands, such as Samsung Pay. The first version of the application allowed users to reload prepaid mobile service, pay bills, purchase movie tickets and flight tickets, send and receive money from friends and family, and make payments at stores and restaurants, although initially these services were only supported in Taman Tun Dr Ismail. Additional money could be added to the e-wallet through JomPay, debit cards, credit cards, and Touch 'n Go reload PINs. The initial release of the Touch 'n Go wallet app was well received by users, especially during the pilot test in Taman Tun Dr. Ismail. However, an additional function was criticized by many users: it allowed users to move their balance to their physical Touch 'n Go card, but it did not automatically transfer the funds to the physical card; instead, users had to go to Touch 'n Go kiosks within 24 hours after the money was sent, or else the balance would be sent to their e-wallet account. After a great amount of criticism, Touch 'n Go temporarily suspended the feature.

On 15 November 2017, Touch 'n Go was granted permission by the Central Bank of Malaysia to partner with Ant Financial, a Chinese-based financial company that operates Alipay, to form a joint venture to allow the technology and platform used in the Alipay app to be adopted in the Touch 'n Go e-wallet service.

In June 2018, it was reported that Touch 'n Go was pilot testing the uses of the Touch 'n Go eWallet in rapid transit, as the ticketing system was enabled on the Kelana Jaya line in the Klang Valley. Pilot testing only applied to stations in Kelana Jaya, KL Gateway–Universiti, Kerinchi, KL Sentral, Dang Wangi, KLCC, and Ampang Park. The test was reported to be successful in February 2020 and was planned to be fully deployed on the LRT and MRT.

In August 2018, Touch 'n Go announced that it had begun the pilot test for RFID-based payment on toll roads for selected drivers from 3 September 2018 onwards. Currently, Touch 'n Go has discontinued the sales of SmartTAG in favor of the RFID-based payment system. On 2 November 2018, the second round of pilot testing was rolled out to allow more drivers to sign up for the test before the RFID system was made available to the public. Initially, the installation of the RFID chip into the car could only be done by Touch 'n Go staff at the RFID fitment center, but as the RFID program exited the pilot testing and was made available to the public on 15 February 2020, users could install their RFID chip themselves from 15 May 2020. The chip itself can be bought at Lazada and Shopee.

Support for taxi-hailing mobile apps was added in November 2018 when Touch 'n Go partnered with EzCab and Public Cab, allowing users to make payments via QR code. This was later expanded to support MULA on 7 January 2020, and later MyCar on 4 April 2020.

Touch 'n Go eWallet was also the first eWallet to convert Kuala Lumpur's most famous Ramadan bazaar—Kampong Kashless—in Kampong Bahru into a venue that can accept cashless payments with the implementation of QR codes. It welcomed more than 250,000 Malaysians including local celebrities and government officials.

On 12 August 2019, Touch 'n Go hired the former Chief Executive Officer of Firefly and Group Chief Revenue Officer of Malaysia Airlines: Ignatius Ong as the Chief Executive Officer for TNG Digital Sdn Bhd, while Syahrunizam Samsudin became Chief Executive Officer for its parent company, Touch 'n Go.

Some e-commerce websites owned by the Alibaba Group began to support Touch 'n Go eWallet payments on 1 October 2019, though support was initially only provided on the retail sites TMall and Taobao, with support for Lazada added on 29 October 2019.

Touch 'n Go eWallet was one of the three e-wallet services in Malaysia (the other being Boost and GrabPay) that was eligible for its users to receive an RM30 stimulus plan as part of the E-Tunai Rakyat program under the Budget 2020 plan, which encourages the adoption of cashless and mobile payment in Malaysia. Unlike its competitors, GrabPay and Boost, whose P2P transfer functionality were completely disabled until users have finished their RM30 which were received from the stimulus plan, Touch 'n Go eWallet did not show an additional RM30 from their user balance when users attempt to perform P2P transfer, which made P2P transfer functionality still usable despite the balance from the stimulus plan remaining inside their account.

Touch 'n Go eWallet joined DuitNow, an electronic transaction ecosystem in Malaysia which allows the funds from Touch 'n Go eWallet to be transferred to other competing services and vice versa, and allows users to make payments to merchants that use only one unified DuitNow QR code, which can also be used by competing e-wallet apps. Announced in February 2020, it is slated to be operational by July 2020.

Japan become the first country outside Malaysia to support Touch 'n Go eWallet payment via Alipay Connect.

From early 2020, during the COVID-19 pandemic and the enforcement of the movement control order, Touch 'n Go eWallet and other competing e-wallet services have seen boosted in popularity as many users rely on these services to make payments for take-out and donations for zakat. The adoption of cashless payment would also hopefully help small and medium-sized enterprises thrive and sustain during the pandemic period.

Touch 'n Go eWallet launched its loyalty programme – The Goal Hunter – in October 2020. The Goal Hunter was introduced to allow businesses to partner with the eWallet and gain more customers via campaigns that reward users with a spectrum of #LebihBanyakEsktra cashbacks and e-Vouchers. Touch 'n Go eWallet users are able to collect rewards from a range of featured e-Vouchers from several brands on a monthly basis. Users only need to start activating their goal to collect stamps when they transact with the eWallet anytime - every RM10 spent at any of its over 280,000 merchants touchpoints nationwide, whether online or in-store, to get 1 stamp. Users need only 2 stamps to get 1 Reward Voucher. Users can then choose up to 5 Rewards of their choice every month. New Reward Vouchers are refreshed on a monthly basis, thus users are required to Start their Goals every month.

Services
Touch 'n Go eWallet can be accessed by smartphones via the Touch 'n Go eWallet app. It utilizes QR code technology for local in-store payments. The Touch 'n Go eWallet app also provides features such as utility bills payment from telecommunications companies like Unifi, Maxis, and Digi; loan repayments for courts, MBSJ payments and PTPTN; car parking payment; P2P transfer; mobile prepaid top-up; airline ticket bookings; and movie tickets from TGV Cinemas. The auto-reload feature allows users with low credit balance to automatically have it reloaded for game credits and prepaid phone credits by using credit or debit cards saved in the eWallet. In addition, Touch 'n Go eWallet allows users to view their remaining balance on their physical Touch 'n Go cards, although users will not be able to reload their physical cards using the app.

The PayDirect feature allows users to add their physical Touch 'n Go cards into the eWallet to use the added Touch 'n Go cards at toll booths, though toll fares are deducted from the eWallet balance instead of the physical Touch 'n Go cards. As an alternative for toll payments, cars with the Touch 'n Go RFID Tag can pass through toll gates at RFID toll booths to make toll payments. Toll fares are deducted from the eWallet balance.

Touch 'n Go eWallet is the first and only eWallet to offer a money-back guarantee feature on its eWallet. It is a protection feature in the Touch ‘n Go eWallet, that in the unlikely event an unauthorised transaction is made on the user’s eWallet account, Touch 'n Go eWallet will refund the disputed amount, provided that the requirements under the Terms & Conditions of the Money-back Guarantee are met.

Touch 'n Go eWallet also allows online check-out on e-commerce websites owned by the Alibaba Group including TMall, Taobao, and Lazada; online TV shopping channels such as Go Shop and WowShop; the iTunes Store; Apple Music; iOS App Store; Mac App Store; and HuaWei App Gallery.

Several chain tenants, franchises and restaurants accept Touch 'n Go eWallet payments, including Tesco, all retail stores owned by Dairy Farm International Holdings (Giant Hypermarket, Cold Storage, Mercato), Watsons, KFC, McDonald's, Dunkin' Donuts, Baskin-Robbins, Starbucks, Coffee Bean and Tea Leaf, Shell, Petron, and 99 Speedmart. Several chain convenience store companies, including 7-Eleven and myNews, support Touch 'n Go eWallet payment. Touch 'n Go eWallet is also supported on taxi-hailing mobile apps including EzCab, Public Cab, MULA and MyCar; and online food delivery services such as DeliverEat, Aliments, Beep Delivery, Go Eat, EASI, LOLOL, MULA Eats, PichaEats, RunningMan, SmartBite, McDelivery, KFC Delivery, and Pizza Hut Delivery.

Touch 'n Go eWallet can be used to pay for car parking and street parking at the following areas:

Fundraising
During the COVID-19 pandemic and the enforcement of the movement control order in 2020, Touch 'n Go introduced the charity fundraising program that allows users to make donations via Touch 'n Go eWallet. Notable charity organizations that participated in Touch 'n Go eWallet fundraising program include Tzu Chi Foundation, Make A Wish Foundation, Malaysian Red Crescent Society, Rotary Club, and Malaysian AIDS Council. , Touch 'n Go eWallet has facilitated donations to 22 non-governmental organizations in Malaysia with amounts worth more than RM280,000 (~US$69,000). Latest donation transactions facilitated to date on 31 Dec 2020 amounts to RM5,432,319 donations received with a total of 215,314 transactions. Some of the charity organizations who have received donations via the Touch 'n Go eWallet are SPCA, Kechara Kitchen Soup Society, Persatuan Penduduk Laguna Merbok (PPLM), Persatuan Kebajikan dan Amal Qi Li Xiang, Warisan Ummah Ikhlas Foundation, Persatuan Orang Kurang Upaya Kuching, Hospis Malaysia, CREST, Persatuan Kebajikan Xiong Wen, Persatuan Kebajikan Shan De Johor Bahru, Lembaga Pengurus SMJK Yuk Choy, The National Kidney Foundation of Malaysia (NKF), Pertubuhan Pusat Penjagaan Kanak-Kanak Cacat Shan Dai Selangor, House of Love, Hope Johor Bahru, Grace Covenant Community Care Bhd, Persatuan Dermawan Jishan Bukit Mertajam Pulau Pinang, Persatuan Ambulans Komuniti Sungai Ara, Pertubuhan Peladang Kawasan Bagan Datoh, Yayasan Generasi Gemilang, Malaysian AIDS Foundation, Malaysian Association for the Blind, Persatuan Buddhist USM, Persatuan Penganut Agama Buddha Kadhampa Johor Jaya, Persatuan Persaudaraan Kristian Rumah Charis, Pintar Foundation, Rotary Club BP/Haemodialysis/Charity Foundation, Yayasan Al-Quds Malaysia, Yayasan Ar-Ri’ayah, Yayasan Belia Buddhist Malaysia, Yayasan Chow Kit, Yayasan Ikhlas, Yayasan Pekerja Malaysia, Yayasan Perintis Malaysia, Yayasan Wakaf Buku, and several more.

Reception

See also
vcash, one of the earliest defunct mobile e-wallet platforms in Malaysia

References

External links
Official website

2017 establishments in Malaysia
Online companies of Malaysia
Malaysian brands
Internet properties established in 2017
Companies based in Kuala Lumpur
Mobile payments
Mobile applications
Online payments
Electronic toll collection
Fare collection systems
Road transport in Malaysia
Alibaba Group
Joint ventures
Malaysian companies established in 2017